Albert Jojuan Belle (born August 25, 1966), known until 1990 as Joey Belle, is an American former Major League Baseball outfielder who played from 1989 to 2000, most notably for the Cleveland Indians. Known for his violent temperament and intimidating stature, Belle was one of the leading sluggers of his time, and in 1995 became the only player to ever hit 50 doubles and 50 home runs in a season. He was also the first player to break the $10 million per year compensation contract in Major League Baseball.

Belle was a five-time All-Star
and Silver Slugger.  He retired with a .295 career batting average, and averaged 37 home runs and 120 RBIs per season between 1991 and 2000. He is one of only six players in MLB history to have nine consecutive 100-RBI seasons.

Early life
Albert and his fraternal twin, Terry, were born on August 25, 1966, in Shreveport, Louisiana, the son of Albert Belle Sr., a high school baseball and football coach, and Carrie Belle, a former math teacher. He attained the rank of Eagle Scout in the Boy Scouts of America. Belle attended Huntington High School in Shreveport, where he was a star baseball and football player, a member of the National Honor Society and vice president of the local Future Business Leaders of America. He graduated sixth in his high school class and made the all-state baseball team twice. In 1984, he was selected to play for the USA in the Junior Olympics, in which the U.S. won a silver medal. He played outfield and pitched, winning one game. After graduation, Belle accepted a baseball scholarship to Louisiana State University.

College

Belle played college baseball at Louisiana State University from 1985 to 1987, where he made 1st team All-SEC in 1986 and 1987 and played in 184 games, with 585 at bats, 194 hits, 30 doubles, 49 home runs, 172 runs batted in, 157 runs, a .670 slugging percentage, and a .332 batting average. In 1986, he played collegiate summer baseball in the Cape Cod Baseball League for the Chatham A's and was named a league all-star, then returned to the league in 1987 to play for the Hyannis Mets.
However, the stress of being a potential high prospect shifted his personality, turning tense after his sophomore year. In his junior year, he was batting .349 before an incident involving a heckler insulting him with racial epithets at an SEC Tournament game led to a suspension that kept him out of the College World Series.

After college, he was drafted by the Cleveland Indians in the second round of the 1987 MLB draft.

Major League career summary
Belle became the fourth player to have eight straight seasons of 30 home runs and 100 RBIs, joining Babe Ruth, Jimmie Foxx and Lou Gehrig (a feat since matched by Albert Pujols, Rafael Palmeiro, Manny Ramirez and Alex Rodriguez). He was an accomplished baserunner, with a career-high 23 steals in 1993, and 17 steals in 1999 despite hip problems. He led the league three times in RBIs, three times in total bases, three times in extra-base hits and twice in slugging. He was a five-time All-Star between 1993 and 1997.  He had a powerful throwing arm, and was a gifted pitcher in high school. His range factor by games played was consistently higher than the major league average at that position; nevertheless, he still managed to accrue a -63 Total Zone Runs during 12 major league seasons.

Belle's career highs in home runs, RBIs, batting average, runs scored and walks occurred in five separate seasons. In 2006, the Hardball Times published a statistical comparison of Belle's career statistics with that of 60 of his current and former peers. The article ranked him in career "prime value", behind current Hall of Famer Ralph Kiner and recent inductee Frank Thomas.

In 1992, Belle would have become one of only five players in MLB history to hit a home run over the left-field roof of Detroit's Tiger Stadium (joining Harmon Killebrew, Frank Howard, Cecil Fielder and Mark McGwire). However, the ball struck a light tower on top of the roof and caromed back into the stands.

In 1994, Belle lost the batting title to New York Yankees outfielder Paul O'Neill, .359 to .357. In 1995, Belle became the first player in major league history to hit 50 home runs and 50 doubles in the same season; the last player before him to reach as many as 40 in both categories had been Willie Stargell in 1973. The achievement was especially impressive because Belle played only 143 games in 1995 due to a season shortened by the previous year's player strike.

Belle's reputation and disdain of the media cost him votes for the 1995 MVP Award. He finished second in the voting to the Boston Red Sox' Mo Vaughn even though he led the American League that season in runs scored, home runs, RBIs, slugging percentage and total bases, and outpaced Vaughn head-to-head in every important offensive category except RBIs (both men had 126); both players' teams reached the playoffs. This was in the middle of a three-year streak in which Belle finished 3rd, 2nd and 3rd for the American League MVP. Belle had two other top ten MVP finishes, in 1993 (7th) and 1998 (8th).

In the winter of 1996, Belle signed a 5-year, $55 million (equivalent to $ today) deal with the Chicago White Sox as a free agent. This contract made him the highest-paid player in baseball for a brief period and the first player in baseball history to make $10 million in a season. He enjoyed two great seasons in Chicago, including a career-high 27-game hitting streak in May 1997, and came close to another 50/50 season in 1998 with 49 home runs (a White Sox team record that still stands) and 48 doubles. He also drove in 152 runs to break Zeke Bonura's single-season franchise record of 138 in 1936 (to date, the RBI total also remains a White Sox single-season record). Additionally, when Cal Ripken Jr. ended his record consecutive game streak at 2,632 in September 1998, it was Belle who took over as the major leagues' active leader in the category (his streak of 392, however, ended the next year due to a perceived lack of hustle viewed by his manager).

Belle's contract with the White Sox had an unusual clause allowing him to demand that he would remain one of the three highest-paid players in baseball. In October 1998 he invoked the clause, and when the White Sox declined to give him a raise he immediately became a free agent. He again became the game's highest-paid player, signing a five-year, $65 million ($ today) deal with the Baltimore Orioles. But his career ended just two seasons later when he was forced into retirement at age 34 by degenerative hip osteoarthritis. He was, however, kept on Baltimore's active 40-man roster for the next three years as a condition of the insurance policy which largely reimbursed the Orioles for the remainder of his contract.

Belle homered in the final at-bat of his major-league career, at Oriole Park at Camden Yards on October 1, 2000.

In 1,539 games over 12 seasons, Belle posted a .295 batting average (1726-for-5853) with 974 runs, 389 doubles, 21 triples, 381 home runs, 1239 RBI, 88 stolen bases, 683 bases on balls, .369 on-base percentage and .564 slugging percentage. Defensively, he recorded a .976 fielding percentage playing at left and right field. In 18 postseason games, he hit .230 (14-for-61) with 10 runs, 2 doubles, 6 home runs, 14 RBI, 1 stolen base and 14 walks.

Controversies
In 1990, the Indians sent Belle to the Cleveland Clinic for two months for alcoholism rehabilitation.

Belle was suspended in 1994 for using a corked bat, resulting in a seven-game suspension.  The incident gained further notoriety for his sending teammate Jason Grimsley through the building's ceiling panel to break into the locked umpires' dressing room to replace his corked bat with a teammate's bat.  The revelation of Belle's use of corked bats was later given more emphasis when Cleveland teammate Omar Vizquel wrote in his 2002 autobiography that it would be naive to suggest otherwise, and that "all of Albert's bats were corked."

Belle was fined in 1996 for knocking down Brewers infielder Fernando Viña, who had blocked his way between bases.

Sports reporters resented Belle's refusal to grant interviews before a game. A profane outburst directed at a group of reporters in his team's dugout, including NBC Sports personality Hannah Storm, was widely reported during the 1995 World Series. He was unrepentant afterward: "The Indians wanted me to issue a statement of regret when the fine was announced, but I told them to take it out. I apologize for nothing."

Eventually, Belle routinely refused to speak with the media. "I don't get excited talking about myself", he explained. "Guys such as Sandy Koufax, Joe DiMaggio and Steve Carlton did not interview, and it was no big deal. They were quiet. I am also quiet. I just want to concentrate on baseball. Why does everyone want to hear me talk, anyway?"

Buster Olney wrote about his outbursts as a member of the Cleveland Indians:
It was taken as fact in baseball circles that Albert Belle was nuts.... He slurped coffee constantly and seemed to be in a perpetual caffeinated frenzy. Few escaped his wrath: on some days he would destroy the postgame buffet ... launching plates into the shower, and after one poor at-bat against Boston, he retreated to the visitors' clubhouse and took a bat to teammate Kenny Lofton's boombox. Belle preferred to have the clubhouse cold, below 60 degrees, and when one chilly teammate turned up the heat, Belle walked over, turned down the thermostat and smashed it with his bat. His nickname, thereafter, was "Mr. Freeze." ... The Indians billed him $10,000 a year for the damage he caused in clubhouses on the road and at home, and tolerated his behavior only because he was an awesome slugger....

In 2001, following his retirement, the New York Daily News columnist Bill Madden wrote:
Sorry, there'll be no words of sympathy here for Albert Belle. He was a surly jerk before he got hurt and now he's a hurt surly jerk....He was no credit to the game. Belle's boorish behavior should be remembered by every member of the Baseball Writers' Association when it comes time to consider him for the Hall of Fame.
 
In his first year of Hall of Fame eligibility (2006), he garnered only 7.7% of the baseball writers' votes, missing election by an extremely wide margin. But his vote total was high enough to keep his name on the ballot for the following year. In 2007, however, he garnered only 19 votes (3.5%).

In retirement, Belle had his first encounter with the Cleveland Indians since leaving the club in 1996, during their 2012 spring training in Goodyear, Arizona and was joined by former teammates Kenny Lofton, Sandy Alomar Jr., and Carlos Baerga. In spite of this, Belle declined both to attend the 20th anniversary celebration of the 1995 World Series team in 2015 and the 2016 ceremony when he was inducted into the Indians team Hall of Fame.

Legal troubles
In October 1995, Belle's house in Euclid, Ohio was egged by teenagers after he turned away trick-or-treaters on Halloween. Belle chased one of the trick-or-treaters in his car. Belle was fined $100 for reckless operation of a vehicle. The guardian of the teenager later sued Belle for $850,000 contending that Belle's car had bumped into the teenager. The lawsuit was settled in 1997.

In 2006, Belle was sentenced to 90 days in jail and five years' probation after he admitted to stalking his former girlfriend.

On March 25, 2018, Belle was arrested in Scottsdale, Arizona and charged with indecent exposure and DUI. All charges were dismissed the following month.

Awards and accomplishmentsCollege (LSU): 1st team All-SEC (1986, 1987)
 South 1 Regional Tournament MVP (1986)
 2nd team All-America (1986)
 3rd team All-America (1987)Major League Baseball (Cleveland Indians, Chicago White Sox, Baltimore Orioles):'
 AL home run leader (1995)
 AL RBI leader (1993, 1995-tied with Mo Vaughn, 1996)
 AL doubles leader (1995-tied with Edgar Martínez)
 AL runs leader (1995-tied with Edgar Martínez)
 AL slugging percentage leader (1995, 1998)
 AL outfield assist leader (RF) (1999-tie)
 Named to Silver Slugger team (1993, 1994, 1995, 1996, 1998)
 All-Star (1993, 1994, 1995, 1996, 1997)
 First player to ever hit 50 HR and 50 Doubles (1995)
 The Sporting News Player of the Year (1995)
 Baseball Digest Player of the Year (1995)
 Led major leagues in the 1990s with 1,099 RBI
 Led major leagues in extra-base hits in the 1990s with 711
 4th player ever to have 8 straight seasons with 30 HR and 100 RBI
 Inducted into the Louisiana Sports Hall of Fame (June 2005)
 AL leader in runs created (1998)
 AL leader in OPS+ (1998)
 AL leader in total bases (1994, 1995, 1998)

See also

 Cleveland Guardians award winners and league leaders
 List of Major League Baseball annual runs scored leaders
 List of Major League Baseball annual doubles leaders
 List of Major League Baseball career home run leaders
 List of Major League Baseball career OPS leaders
 List of Major League Baseball career putouts as a left fielder leaders
 List of Major League Baseball career runs batted in leaders
 List of Major League Baseball career slugging percentage leaders
 List of Major League Baseball doubles records
 List of people from Shreveport, Louisiana
 Louisiana Sports Hall of Fame

References

External links

1966 births
Living people
Major League Baseball left fielders
Baltimore Orioles players
Chicago White Sox players
Cleveland Indians players
American League All-Stars
Baseball players from Shreveport, Louisiana
American League home run champions
American League RBI champions
African-American baseball players
Kinston Indians players
Hyannis Harbor Hawks players
Chatham Anglers players
LSU Tigers baseball players
Canton-Akron Indians players
Silver Slugger Award winners
Fraternal twins
American twins
21st-century African-American people
20th-century African-American sportspeople